The Pythian Sisters are the female auxiliary to the Knights of Pythias.

History 

The origin of the Pythian auxiliaries for women is rather complicated. In 1888 the Supreme Lodge of the Knights of Pythias approved the creation of a female auxiliary with a ritual written by Joseph Addison Hill. However, there were other women who favored a ritual written by Mrs. Alva A. Young. Two organizations were organized: the Pythian Sisterhood, using Young's ritual in Concord, New Hampshire on February 22, 1888 and the Pythian Sisters of the World, that same year, in Warsaw, Indiana using Hill's ritual. In addition to the differences in ritual, the Concord group did not accept (male) members of the Knights of Pythias as members, whereas the Warsaw group did. In 1894 the Supreme Lodge ruled that its members could not belong to another organization with "Pythian" in its title, so the Warsaw group changed its name to the Rathbone Sisters of the World, in order to keep its male members. In 1906 the Supreme Lodge repealed that prohibition and the two auxiliaries merged into a new order simply known as the Pythian Sisters.

Organization 

Local units are known as "Temples", state units are called "Grand Temples" and the national structure is called the "Supreme Temple", which meets biennially with the Supreme Lodge of the Knights of Pythias. In 1979 the Sisterhood did not have a regular headquarters, but the Supreme Temple offices were located in what ever city the Supreme Secretary happened to reside, which that year was in Lonaconing, Pennsylvania.

Pythian Sunshine Girls 

The Pythian Sisters have a youth affiliate, the  Pythian Sunshine Girls, started in 1930. It is open to girls 8–20 and has local Councils in Arizona, New Mexico, California, Ohio, Virginia and Texas, with some interest expressed in creating Councils in Kentucky and Michigan. Denise Friend of Albuquerque, New Mexico is the current Supreme Royal Princess, apparently the leading administrator. (Lynette Burnam was the Grand Royal Princess in Arizona in 1968-1969. )

Membership 
In 1964 the qualifications for membership included being over 16 years of age, of good moral character, able to speak the English language and be the wife, widow, sister, half-sister, sister-in-law, mother, stepmother or mother-in-law of a member of the  Knights of Pythias. Male members who had taken any of the Degrees of the Order were also eligible. 
Today the membership requirements are only that the candidate be over sixteen, speak English and believe in a Supreme Being.

See also 
Order of the Eastern Star

References

Further reading 
Ida M. Jayne-Weaver and Emma D. Wood History of the Order of Pythian Sisters 1925

External links 
Pythian Sisters home page

Knights of Pythias
Organizations established in 1888
Women's organizations based in the United States
Women's organizations based in Canada
1888 establishments in the United States